

Fighters

Bomber and Attack Aircraft

Sources
 
 

Russian and Soviet military-related lists
Soviet